Livingston station may refer to:

 Livingston North railway station, a station in Livingston, Scotland on the Edinburgh-Bathgate Line
 Livingston South railway station, a station in Livingston, Scotland on the Shotts Line
 Livingston railway station, a former station in Livingston, Scotland
 Livingston station (Staten Island Railway), a former station on the Staten Island Railway
 Newpark railway station, a former station in Livingston, Scotland
 Livingston Station, West Lothian, a village now part of the new town of Livingston, Scotland
 Livingston Station, Kentucky, the former name of a village in Kentucky
 Livingston station (Northern Pacific Railway), a former station in Livingston, Montana
 Livingston station (Altamont Corridor Express), a future station in Livingston, California